Bottom of the 9th is an American drama film, directed by Raymond De Felitta, from a screenplay by Robert Bruzio. The movie's original title is STANO. It stars Joe Manganiello, Sofía Vergara, Michael Rispoli and Denis O'Hare.

Plot
After serving 17 years in prison for a violent mistake, Sonny returns to his Bronx neighborhood and to his baseball aspirations.

Cast
 Joe Manganiello as Sonny Stano 
Kevin William Paul as Young Sonny Stano
 Sofía Vergara as Angela Ramirez 
 Denis O'Hare as Officer Lonergan
 Michael Rispoli as Coach Harris
 Michael Maize as Tommy
 Vincent Pastore as Cosmo
 James Madio as Joey Cosenza
 Robert Bruzio as Bobby
 Burt Young as Scaleri 
 Jimmy Smagula

Production
In July 2017, Joe Manganiello and Sofía Vergara joined the cast of the film, with Raymond De Felitta directing from a screenplay by Robert Bruzio. Manganiello will also serve as a producer on the film alongside Nick Manganiello, Bill Chartoff, Lynn Hendee, Eric Fischer through their 3:59 and Off the Chart Entertainment banners, respectively. In August 2017, Kevin William Paul, Jimmy Smagula and James Madio joined the cast of the film. In September 2017, Denis O'Hare, Michael Rispoli and Vincent Pastore joined the cast of the film.

Release
In May 2019, Saban Films acquired distribution rights to the film, and released it on July 19, 2019.

Reception
On Metacritic, the film holds a rating of 58 out of 100, based on 7 critics, indicating "mixed or average reviews".

References

External links
 
 
 

2019 films
American drama films
Saban Films films
Films directed by Raymond De Felitta
2010s English-language films
2010s American films